Orlando P. Vaughan (September 11, 1848 – February 20, 1925) was a member of the Wisconsin State Assembly.

Biography
Vaughan was born on September 11, 1848, in Kankakee, Illinois. He moved with his parents to Black Earth, Wisconsin in 1854. During the American Civil War, he served with the 49th Wisconsin Volunteer Infantry Regiment of the Union Army. Vaughan died in 1925 and is buried in Wauzeka, Wisconsin.

Political career
Vaughan was elected to the Assembly in 1916 and re-elected in 1918. Additionally, he was a member and Chairman of the Crawford County, Wisconsin Board. He was a Republican.

References

See also

People from Kankakee, Illinois
People from Black Earth, Wisconsin
People from Crawford County, Wisconsin
County supervisors in Wisconsin
Republican Party members of the Wisconsin State Assembly
People of Wisconsin in the American Civil War
Union Army soldiers
1848 births
1925 deaths